Polički Vrh is a settlement in the Municipality of Pesnica in northeastern Slovenia. It lies in the Slovene Hills, part of the traditional region of Styria. The municipality is now included in the Drava Statistical Region.

A large mansion in the south of the settlement known as the Jarenina Mansion dates to the 17th century, but was mentioned in written documents dating to the late 11th century. Jarenina Creek flows through the village.

References

External links
Polički Vrh on Geopedia

Populated places in the Municipality of Pesnica